Appleman is a surname. Notable people with the surname include:

Hale Appleman (born 1986), American actor
Mickey Appleman (born 1945), American professional poker player
Philip Appleman (1926–2020), American poet
William Appleman Williams (1921–1990), American historian

Other uses
 An evil character in Bananaman
 A colloquial name of the Mandelbrot set

Occupational surnames